Lobo (fem. Loba) (Spanish for "wolf") is a racial category for a mixed-race person used in Mexican paintings illustrating the caste (casta) system in 17th- and 18th-century Spanish America.

Definitions
Lobo does not have a fixed meaning, with possible parents being a black man and an Indian woman, a Cambujo (African/Amerindian) and an Indian woman, a Torna atrás and an Indian woman, a Mestizo and an Indian woman, or a Salta atrás (of African/European ancestry) and a Mulatto woman.

Lobo was a classification used in official colonial documentation, including the Inquisition trials, marriage registers and censuses. One example of a Loba is a mixed-race woman who came before the Mexican Inquisition; she had been given multiple racial labels. She was publicly known as a China, was known to be a parda (a brown-skinned person), who "looked like a loba", suggesting she had visible African features.

There were regional differences in colonial Mexico for racial labeling. For instance, in Xichú and Casas Viejas, in the Bajío region near Querétaro and the Sierra Gorda mountains, where there were resident indigenous populations, as well as blacks and mulattos, locally the people used lobos as a "normative category".

In his examination of marriage patterns from marital registers, Vinson found no records of lobos marrying each other; brides and grooms thus classified chose partners from other racial categories.

In eighteenth-century casta paintings, lobos are usually shown doing physical work and not lavishly dressed, indicating lower class status. In Joaquín Antonio de Basarás's Origen, costumbres, y estado presente de mexicanos y philipinos (1763), the lobo father is a water carrier, while his Indian wife sells chickens. An early 18th-century set of casta paintings shows the Lobo as the offspring of a Black father and Indigenous mother; in the same set, a Lobo father and an India mother have a dark-skinned child labeled a Lobo Torna atrás, meaning the child more closely resembled the Black father.

A set of casta paintings by Andrés de Islas is typical in the order and combinations of races:

De Español e India, Mestizo (European white and Indian woman, Mestizo)
De Español y Mestiza, Castizo (European white and Mestiza, Castizo, 3/4 white)
De Castizo y Española, Española (Castizo and Spanish woman, the girl child can be classified as Spanish, 7/8 white)
De Español y Negra, Mulata (Spaniard and black woman, Mulatta)
De Español y Mulata, Morisco (Spaniard and Mulatta, Morisco; mixed-race person of part African/European ancestry)
De Español y Morisca, Albino (Spaniard and Morisca, Albino; the child appears Spanish or European but is known to have part African ancestry)
De Español y Albina, Torna atrás (Spaniard and Albina, Torna atrás; the child has visible African features, considered a "throw back" to blackness)
De Indio y Negra, Lobo (Indian man, black woman)
De Indio y Mestiza, CoyoteDe Lobo y Negra, ChinoDe Chino e India, Cambujo (a mixed-race person of part African and mostly Indian ancestry)
De Cambujo e India, Tente en el aire ("tint in the air", related to some African ancestry)
De Tente en el aire y Mulata, Albarazado (white lepers, pallid)
De Albarazado e India, Barcino (ginger)
De Barcino y Cambuja, CalpamulatoIndios Mecos bárbaros ("barbarian" Meco Indians)

See also
Coyote (racial category)

References

Further reading
García Saiz, Maria Conception. Las Castas Mexicanas: Un Género Pictórico Americano. Milan: Olivetti 1989.
Katzew, Ilona. Casta Painting: Images of Race in Eighteenth-Century Mexico. New Haven: Yale University Press 2004.
Vinson, Ben III. Before Mestizaje: The Frontiers of Race and Caste in Colonial Mexico.'' New York: Cambridge University Press 2018

Former peoples of the African diaspora
African–Native American relations
Spanish colonization of the Americas
New Spain
Colonial Mexico
Colonial Peru
 
Multiracial affairs
Racism in Mexico